Rondae Jaquan Hollis-Jefferson (born January 3, 1995) is an American professional basketball player for the TNT Tropang Giga of the Philippine Basketball Association (PBA). He spent seven seasons in the NBA, and played college basketball for the Arizona Wildcats.

Early life and high school career

Hollis-Jefferson was born and raised in Chester, Pennsylvania, the son of Rylanda Hollis, a single mother who worked two jobs as a dietary supervisor and bartender. He grew up with older brother Rahlir, who also became a professional basketball player. Their father was frequently absent and spent some time in jail. Hollis-Jefferson began honing his game when he was 12. At a young age he took a strong interest in defense and acknowledged that he scored only because he was taller than his peers.

He attended Chester High School where he began an outstanding basketball career under head coach Larry Yarbray. The small forward became the first player to ever be named Delaware County Player of the Year for multiple seasons. He was also instrumental in Chester's first-ever undefeated season. The Clippers finished 91–5 in his last three years at the school and won two state titles. In his senior year, he lost in the state title game to Lower Merion. He finished his career with more than 1,000 points and a school-record 780 rebounds.

Hollis-Jefferson participated in the 2013 McDonald's All-American Game against future Arizona teammate, Aaron Gordon. Following the event, he took part in the Jordan Brand Classic with some of the most highly recruited high school stars in the nation such as Julius Randle. At the conclusion of Hollis-Jefferson's years with the Clippers, he was tabbed the 6th best small forward of his class by 247Sports.com and the fifth best by Rivals.com. He eventually chose to attend the University of Arizona and represent the school through their successful basketball program over other possibilities such as Florida and Syracuse.

|}

College career

In his freshman season with Arizona, Hollis-Jefferson became known as fierce scorer, rebounder, and shot-blocker despite his relatively small size. The start of his season was marked with 10 points, 5 rebounds, and 2 assists against Cal Poly off the bench. He posted his first double-double in a game against Oregon. He improved on his free throw shooting as his freshman year progressed. Throughout the season, Hollis-Jefferson mainly functioned as the team's sixth man, but became a starter after Brandon Ashley was lost for the season with a foot injury in the Wildcats' 60–58 upset loss to California on February 1. Hollis-Jefferson ended up starting 6 of 38 games played due to the roster that was dominated by the likes of Aaron Gordon, but still got his name on the Pac-12 All-Freshman Team. In his freshman year, Hollis-Jefferson averaged 9.1 points, 5.7 rebounds, and 1.4 assists per game. "It's a lot different than just waking up, going to school and playing basketball for Chester," said Hollis-Jefferson of his freshman year. "In the beginning of the season, I was lost. But it's not about who's starting, it's about who finishes. It stuck with me for about a month or so, playing behind people. I went along with it and kept playing. I need to make people respect my shot. I know I can shoot it. I have to stay in attack mode."

As a sophomore, Hollis-Jefferson increased his averages to 11.3 points and 6.9 rebounds per game. He improved in his leadership and offense. As a sophomore, he was voted first-team All-Pac-12, and was named to the Pac-12 All-Defensive Team. He helped lead the Wildcats to two consecutive Elite Eight appearances in the NCAA Tournament, losing to Wisconsin on both occasions. On April 7, 2015, Hollis-Jefferson declared for the 2015 NBA draft, forgoing his final two years of college eligibility. "I don't know if I've enjoyed coaching a player more than I've enjoyed coaching Rondae," coach Sean Miller said.

Awards and honors
NCAA Tournament West Region All-Tournament Team (2015)
First-team All-Pac-12 (2015)
Pac-12 All-Tournament Team (2015)
Pac-12 All-Defensive Team (2015)
Pac-12 Player of the Week (2015)
Pac-12 All-Freshman Team (2014)
Maui Invitational All-Tournament Team (2014)

Professional career

Brooklyn Nets (2015–2019)
On June 25, 2015, Hollis-Jefferson was selected by the Portland Trail Blazers with the 23rd overall pick in the 2015 NBA draft. His draft rights, along with Steve Blake, were subsequently traded to the Brooklyn Nets for Mason Plumlee and the draft rights to the 41st overall pick, Pat Connaughton. On July 6, 2015, he signed his rookie scale contract with the Nets. He made his debut for the Nets in their season opener on October 28, 2015, recording eight points and five rebounds off the bench in a 115–100 loss to the Chicago Bulls. On November 20, he had a season-best game with 13 points and 11 rebounds as a starter in a loss to the Boston Celtics. On December 7, he was diagnosed with a non-displaced fracture of the posterior talus in his right ankle, an injury requiring surgery and eight to ten weeks of rehabilitation. He returned to action in late March.

On November 12, 2016, Hollis-Jefferson scored a then career-high 20 points and tied a career high with 13 rebounds in a 122–104 win over the Phoenix Suns.

On December 14, 2017, Hollis-Jefferson scored a career-high 25 points on 10-for-16 shooting in a 111–104 loss to the New York Knicks. He strained his right groin during a 116–91 loss to the Milwaukee Bucks on January 26, returning to action on February 26 against the Chicago Bulls after missing the Nets' previous 11 games.

Hollis-Jefferson missed the first three games of the 2018–19 season with a hip injury and the birth of his first child. On November 28, 2018, in a 101–91 loss to the Utah Jazz, Hollis-Jefferson had 14 points and a season-high 11 rebounds for his first double-double. On March 19, 2019, he made a layup with eight-tenths of a second remaining to lift the Nets to a 123–121 win over the Sacramento Kings.

On June 17, the Nets opted not to make Hollis-Jefferson a qualifying offer, making him an unrestricted free agent.

Toronto Raptors (2019–2020)
On July 18, 2019, Hollis-Jefferson signed with the defending champion, Toronto Raptors.

On December 3, 2020, Hollis-Jefferson signed a non-guaranteed preseason contract with the Minnesota Timberwolves. He was waived by the Timberwolves shortly after he signed on December 19, 2020.

Portland Trail Blazers (2021)
On April 8, 2021, Hollis-Jefferson signed a 10-day contract with the Portland Trail Blazers. On April 18, he signed a second 10-day contract and 10 days later, he signed for the rest of the season after appearing in six games.

Beşiktaş (2021–2022)
On September 28, 2021, Hollis-Jefferson signed with Beşiktaş Icrypex of the Basketbol Süper Ligi. He scored a career-high 26 points in a 69–82 loss over the Rytas.

Atléticos de San Germán (2022)
On April 11, 2022, Hollis-Jefferson signed with Atléticos de San Germán of the Baloncesto Superior Nacional.

TNT Tropang Giga (2023–present)
In February 2023, Hollis-Jefferson signed with the TNT Tropang Giga of the Philippine Basketball Association (PBA) to replace Jalen Hudson as the team's import for the 2023 PBA Governors' Cup.

Player profile
Hollis-Jefferson plays both forward positions. Using his athleticism and  wingspan, he is part of the NBA trend of undersized power forwards.

Career statistics

NBA

Regular season

|-
| style="text-align:left;"|
| style="text-align:left;"|Brooklyn
| 29 || 17 || 21.2 || .457 || .286 || .712 || 5.3 || 1.5 || 1.3 || .6 || 5.8
|-
| style="text-align:left;"|
| style="text-align:left;"|Brooklyn
| 78 || 50 || 22.6 || .434 || .224 || .751 || 5.8 || 2.0 || 1.1 || .6 || 8.7
|-
| style="text-align:left;"|
| style="text-align:left;"|Brooklyn
| 68 || 59 || 28.2 || .472 || .241 || .788 || 6.8 || 2.5 || 1.0 || .7 || 13.9
|-
| style="text-align:left;"|
| style="text-align:left;"|Brooklyn
| 59 || 21 || 20.9 || .411 || .184 || .645 || 5.3 || 1.6 || .7 || .5 || 8.9
|-
| style="text-align:left;"|
| style="text-align:left;"|Toronto
| 60 || 6 || 18.7 || .471 || .130 || .734 || 4.7 || 1.8 || .8 || .4 || 7.0
|-
| style="text-align:left;"|
| style="text-align:left;"|Portland
| 11 || 1 || 9.7 || .500 || .000 || .563 || 2.4 || 1.2 || .2 || .4 || 2.5
|- class="sortbottom"
| style="text-align:center;" colspan="2"|Career
| 305 || 154 || 22.2 || .449 || .212 || .735 || 5.5 || 1.9 || .9 || .5 || 9.0

Playoffs

|-
| style="text-align:left;"|2019
| style="text-align:left;"|Brooklyn
| 4 || 0 || 15.5 || .485 || 1.000 || .800 || 3.0 || 1.5 || .3 || 1.3 || 13.3
|-
| style="text-align:left;"|2020
| style="text-align:left;"|Toronto
| 5 || 0 || 7.8 || .400 || .000 || .750 || 2.0 || .6 || .4 || .2 || 2.8
|-
| style="text-align:left;"|2021
| style="text-align:left;"|Portland
| 5 || 0 || 7.2 || .800 || .000 || .667 || 1.6 || .0 || .2 || .2 || 2.0
|- class="sortbottom"
| style="text-align:center;" colspan="2"|Career
| 14 || 0 || 9.8 || .500 || .500 || .778 || 2.1 || .6 || .3 || .5 || 5.5

College

|-
| style="text-align:left;"|2013–14
| style="text-align:left;"|Arizona
| 38 || 6  || 25.3 || .490 || .200 || .682 || 5.7 || 1.4 || .7 || 1.1 || 9.1
|-
| style="text-align:left;"|2014–15
| style="text-align:left;"|Arizona
| 38 || 25 || 28.7 || .502 || .207 || .707 || 6.8 || 1.5 || 1.1 || .8 || 11.2
|- class="sortbottom"
| style="text-align:center;" colspan="2"|Career
| 76 || 31 || 27.0 || .496 || .205 || .697 || 6.3 || 1.5 || .9 || .9 || 10.2

Personal life
Hollis-Jefferson is a practicing Muslim.

References

External links

 Arizona Wildcats bio

1995 births
African-American Muslims
Living people
21st-century African-American sportspeople
African-American basketball players
American expatriate basketball people in Canada
American expatriate basketball people in the Philippines
American expatriate basketball people in South Korea
American expatriate basketball people in Turkey
American men's basketball players
Arizona Wildcats men's basketball players
Atléticos de San Germán players
Basketball players from Pennsylvania
Beşiktaş men's basketball players
Brooklyn Nets players
Chester High School alumni
Jeonju KCC Egis players
Philippine Basketball Association imports
Portland Trail Blazers draft picks
Portland Trail Blazers players
Small forwards
Sportspeople from Chester, Pennsylvania
TNT Tropang Giga players
Toronto Raptors players